The barred pipefish (Syngnathus auliscus) is a species of the pipefishes, widespread in the eastern pacific from the Southern California, United States, to northern Peru. Marine / brackishwater subtropical demersal fish, up to 18.0 cm length.

References

barred pipefish
Fish of the Gulf of California
Fish of Mexican Pacific coast
Western Central American coastal fauna
barred pipefish